The Big House may refer to:

Buildings

Types of building
 Anglo-Irish big house
 Great house, in Ireland, specifically houses of the Anglo-Irish ascendancy
 a type of longhouse among the cultures of the Pacific Northwest Coast
 Wharenui, a communal house of the Māori people of New Zealand
 a slang term for prison
An African-American Vernacular English term referring to a plantation house on an American slave compound.

Individual buildings
 8 House or Big House, a mixed use development in Ørestad, Copenhagen, Denmark
 , Saint Petersburg, Russia, headquarters of the Federal Security Service
 Big House, Landshipping, Pembrokeshire, Wales
 Ibrox Stadium, Glasgow, Scotland, nicknamed 'The Big Hoose'
 Big House, Irene, Gauteng, South Africa, the residence of South African statesman Jan Smuts

United States
 The Allman Brothers Band Museum, Macon, Georgia, also known as "The Big House"
 Big House (Moccasin, Arizona)
 Oklahoma State Fair Arena, Oklahoma City
 Big House (Palisades, New York)
 Michigan Stadium, Ann Arbor, Michigan, nicknamed The Big House

Entertainment
 The Big House (1930 film), starring Chester Morris, Wallace Beery and Robert Montgomery
 The Big House (2000 film), short film directed by Rachel Ward
 The Big House (TV series), a 2004 American television sitcom
 "The Big House" (Brooklyn Nine-Nine), a 2017 television episode
 "The Big House" (Orange Is the New Black), a 2019 television episode
 Big House (band), a country music band from the late 1990s
 Big House (album), their self-titled debut album
 Big House (Canadian band), a Canadian rock music band active in the early 1990s
 "Big House" (song), a 1993 song by Christian rock band Audio Adrenaline

Other uses
 The Big House (tournament), an annual Super Smash Bros. tournament in Michigan
 Clarence "Big House" Gaines, American basketball coach

See also
 The Big Hoose, Scottish prison Barlinnie in Glasgow
 House (disambiguation)
 Big (disambiguation)